Niki Byrgesen (born ) is a Danish male  track cyclist. He competed in the team pursuit event at the 2010 and 2011 UCI Track Cycling World Championships.

References

External links
 Profile at cyclingarchives.com

1990 births
Living people
Danish track cyclists
Danish male cyclists
Place of birth missing (living people)